Blackwater, Virginia may refer to the following places in Virginia:
Blackwater, Lee County, Virginia
Blackwater, Mathews County, Virginia